Alan Burwell (birth registered first ¼ 1943) is an English former professional rugby league footballer who played in the 1960s and 1970s.

Background
Alan Burwell's birth was registered in Hull district, East Riding of Yorkshire, England, he worked as a chemist at Reckitt and Colman, Dansom Lane South, Kingston upon Hull.

Playing career

International honours

County honours
Alan Burwell won a cap(s) for Yorkshire while at Hull Kingston Rovers.

Eastern Division Championship Final appearances
Alan Burwell played  in Hull Kingston Rovers' 13–10 victory over Huddersfield in the Eastern Division Championship Final during the 1962–63 season at Headingley Rugby Stadium, Leeds on Saturday 10 November 1962.

Challenge Cup Final appearances
Alan Burwell played  and scored a long-distance solo try in Hull Kingston Rovers' 5-13 defeat by Widnes in the 1963–64 Challenge Cup Final during the 1963–64 season at Wembley Stadium, London on Saturday 9 May 1964, in front of a crowd of 84,488.

County Cup Final appearances
Alan Burwell played  and scored a try in Hull Kingston Rovers' 25–12 victory over Featherstone Rovers in the 1966 Yorkshire County Cup Final during the 1966–67 season at Headingley Rugby Stadium, Leeds on Saturday 15 October 1966, played , i.e. number 5, and scored a try in the 8–7 victory over Hull F.C. in the 1967 Yorkshire County Cup Final during the 1967–68 season at Headingley Rugby Stadium, Leeds on Saturday 14 October 1967, and played right-, i.e. number 3, in Hull Kingston Rovers' 11-15 defeat by Leeds in the 1975 Yorkshire County Cup Final during the 1975–76 season at Headingley Rugby Stadium, Leeds on Saturday 15 November 1975.

Genealogical information
Alan Burwell is one of seven siblings, he is the younger brother of the rugby  who played in the 1960s for Hull Kingston Rovers; Brian Burwell (born 19 January 1939, birth registered as Barry Burwell during first ¼ 1939 in Hull district – death registered during third ¼ 2005 (aged 66) in Doncaster district). He is married to Heather and has three children - Carolyn (born 1969); Susanne (born 1970, in Australia) and Craig (born 1973). He lives in Hedon.

References

External links
!Great Britain Statistics at englandrl.co.uk (statistics currently missing due to not having appeared for both Great Britain, and England)
(archived by web.archive.org) Workington and Hull KR triumph in the regions
Search for "Alan Burwell" at britishnewspaperarchive.co.uk
Search for "Barry Burwell" at britishnewspaperarchive.co.uk
Search for "Brian Burwell" at britishnewspaperarchive.co.uk

1943 births
Living people
Canterbury-Bankstown Bulldogs captains
Canterbury-Bankstown Bulldogs players
English rugby league players
Great Britain national rugby league team players
Hull Kingston Rovers players
Rugby league centres
Rugby league five-eighths
Rugby league halfbacks
Rugby league wingers
Rugby league players from Kingston upon Hull
Yorkshire rugby league team players